The University of Vocational Technology (UoVT) ,  is established by the parliamentary Act No. 31 of 2008, in 2009 and functions under the purview of the Ministry of Higher Education, Technology and Innovation . The general objective of the University of Vocational Technology is to provide progressive upward movement to the students in the Engineering Technology Education and Industrial Training System, based on their aptitudes and abilities, to acquire university education.

The University of Vocational Technology hosts four faculties, fourteenth departments, and teaches about  5000 students in the fields of mechatronics, manufacturing, IT(software), IT(Network), IT(Multimedia & Web), food, film and television production, building services technology, construction technology, industrial management and teaching.

Faculties and institutes
The University of Vocational Technology, currently has four faculties.

Deans of faculties
Deans are the heads of the faculties. They are responsible for the management and the tasks carried out by the faculty. Deans are appointed among the Faculty Board Members for a period of three years.

Faculty of Engineering Technology

Departments of the faculty

 Department of Manufacturing Technology
 Department of Building Services Technology
 Department of Electrical and Electronics Technology
 Department of Construction Technology

Faculty of Industrial Technology

 Department of Agricultural and Food Technology
 Department of Film and Television Production Technology
 Department of Quantity Surveying
 Department of Management Studies
 Department of Tourism Studies

Faculty of Education Technology

Departments of the faculty

 Department of Education and Training
 Department of Language Studies

Faculty of Information and Communication Technology

Departments of the Faculty

 Department of Software Technology
 Department of Network Technology
 Department of Multimedia and Web Technology
 Department of Interdisciplinary Studies

Continuing Education Centre (CEC)
Continuing Education Centre (CEC) and curriculum development units function  under the Staff Development Centre of the University. These units provide extension services to the agencies in the  TVET sector which are delivering training at NVQ Levels 1 to 6, in the areas of human resource development and curriculum development.

Chancellor, Vice Chancellor & Board Members

Chancellor
The chancellor is the head of the university and is responsible for awarding all the academic degrees. Usually the chancellor is a distinguished person in an academic discipline. Otherwise it is a clergy or a distinguished person in the civil society. Appointment is done by the President of Sri Lanka. The position is mainly ceremonial and duties are usually carried out by the vice chancellor. The current chancellor of the university is Emeritus Professor  Harishchandra Abeygunawardena

Vice chancellor
The Vice-Chancellor is the academic principal and administrative officer of the University, responsible for management tasks. This appointment is also done by the President of Sri Lanka. Currently, Senior Prof. Ranjith Premalal de Silva has been serving as the Vice Chancellor from 8 October 2020.

Board Members
There are board members appointed by the government for the university.

Former Vice Chancellors

Kapila Gunasekara
T. A. Piyasiri
G. L. D. Wickramasinghe

Library
The UoVT operates a network of libraries comprising the main library at University premises. The library is open for students from 8.30 am to 4.30 pm on each day including weekends except Full Moon Poya Days and University holidays.

The library is well equipped with a substantial collection of books in a wide variety of subjects and many foreign and local journals and substantial collection of videos, audios, to supplement print material. The library provides internet facilities for study purposes of students.

In-house photocopying facilities are also available at very nominal rates for the convenience of all library users. The library has copies of past examination papers, which are also available on the University website. Students are advised to read the library information sheets available at all libraries for more details on the facilities provided and how to make use of them.

Student organizations
Students at the university run over 10 clubs and organizations. These include cultural and religious groups, academic clubs, 
and common-interest organizations. The University Students' Union is considered the highest body which represents all internal students.

These student societies include:

 Environmental Society
 Sports Club
 IT Club
 Art Circle
 Gavel Club
 Electronics Club
 Explorer Club
 Society of Food Science and Technology
 Media Society
 Buddhist Students' Union
 IEEE Student Branch in University of Vocational Technology 
 IMechE Chapter in University of Vocational Technology
 IM Club

See also 
 TVET in Sri Lanka

References

External links 
 Ministry of Higher Education
 Links to the UGC Sri Lanka
 online courses

Universities in Sri Lanka
Vocational education in Sri Lanka
Universities and colleges in Colombo
Statutory boards of Sri Lanka
Information technology institutes
Educational institutions established in 2009
Engineering universities and colleges in Sri Lanka
2009 establishments in Sri Lanka